FLA may refer to:

Business and labour 
 Fair Labor Association
 Fellow of the Library Association
 Finance and Leasing Association, in the United Kingdom
 Florida Library Association, association for librarians in Florida
 Free Luxembourger Workers' Union
 Florida Library Association

Education 
 First language acquisition
 First language attrition
 Foreign Language Assistant
 Forest Lake Academy, in Apopka, Florida, United States
 Fraternity Leadership Association

Government and politics 
 Argentine Libertarian Federation
 Azores Liberation Front
 Family Law Act (disambiguation)
 Football Lads Alliance, UK campaign group

Music
 Fight Like Apes, an Irish shoegaze band
 Front Line Assembly, a Canadian electro-industrial band

People 
Jens P. Flå (1923–2002), Norwegian politician

Places 
 Flå, a municipality in Buskerud county, Norway
Flå Station, a railway station in Buskerud county, Norway
 Flå, Sør-Trøndelag, a former municipality in Trøndelag county, Norway
 Flå Church, Trøndelag, a church in Melhus municipality in Trøndelag county, Norway
 Fla., an abbreviation for Florida, a state in the United States

Sport 
 Clube de Regatas do Flamengo, a Brazilian sports association
 Flå IL, a Norwegian sports club
 Florida Panthers, an ice hockey team based in Sunrise, Florida, United States
 Luxembourg Athletics Federation

Other uses 
 Air Florida, a defunct American airline
 Faire: L'amour, a French drama film
 Free-living Amoebozoa infection
 Gustavo Artunduaga Paredes Airport in Florencia, Caquetá, Colombia
 Salish-Spokane-Kalispel language, an indigenous language of the United States
 Fasciclin-like arabinogalactan protein, a class of plant proteins
 Full-load amps, the maximum current of electric motor